James A. Henretta (born November 18, 1940) is an American historian. 
He is a Professor Emeritus of American History at the University of Maryland, College Park. Henretta is a Fulbright Scholar, and has received a grant from the National Endowment for the Humanities.

He graduated from Swarthmore College and Harvard University.

Selected works

 Documents for America's History, Volume 1: To 1877
 America: A Concise History
 Narrative Life of Frederick Douglass
 Evolution and Revolution
 "Salutary Neglect": Colonial Administration Under the Duke of Newcastle
 The Evolution of American Society, 1700-1815: An Interdisciplinary Analysis
 Documents to Accompany America's History, Volume I: To 1877

References

External links
 

1940 births
Living people
21st-century American historians
21st-century American male writers
University of Maryland, College Park faculty
Swarthmore College alumni
Harvard University alumni
American male non-fiction writers